The WhatsOnStage Awards (WOS Awards), formerly known as the Theatregoers' Choice Awards, are organised by the theatre website WhatsOnStage.com. The awards recognise performers and productions of British theatre with an emphasis on London's West End theatre.

Nominations and eventual winners are selected by the theatre-going public's vote. The awards are held each February. Since 2012, they have been staged at the West End's Prince of Wales Theatre.

History
In early 2001, WhatsOnStage.com published the shortlists for that year’s Laurence Olivier Awards and invited site visitors to vote online for who they thought should win. In a fortnight, 5,000 people took part – and their results differed wildly from the Olivier judges. For the 2002 Awards, the editors compiled their own shortlists and in 2003, they held their first Launch Party to announce the shortlists to about 200 industry guests. The first Awards Concert and ceremony was introduced for the 2008 Awards.

Judging
Each year, the Awards shortlists are drawn up with the help of thousands of theatregoers who log on to nominate their favourites across all 20+ awards categories. Nominations are announced at a star-studded launch event held in early December. Voting then opens and runs until the end of January the following year. In 2012/13, over 60,000    theatregoers logged on to vote, with leaders in many categories fluctuating dramatically from day to day.

Ceremony

2018 
The 18th Annual WhatsOnStage Awards concert and ceremony took place on Sunday, 25 February 2018 at the Prince of Wales Theatre.

2019 
The 19th Annual WhatsOnStage Awards concert and ceremony took place on Sunday, 3 March 2019 at the Prince of Wales Theatre.

2020 
The 2020 WhatsOnStage Awards concert and ceremony took place on 1 March 2020 at the Prince of Wales Theatre.

2021 
Due to the COVID-19 pandemic, the 2021 WhatsOnStage Awards were held virtually. They did not honour creatives as they traditionally did but instead recognized twenty one members of the public who had supported the theatre industry during the pandemic.

2022 
The 2022 WhatsOnStage Awards concert and ceremony were held on 27 February 2022 at the Prince of Wales Theatre.

2023 
The 2023 WhatsOnStage Awards concert and ceremony were held on 12 February 2023 at the Prince of Wales Theatre.

Presenters
Presenters of the WhatsOnStage Awards have included James Corden, Sheridan Smith, Christopher Biggins, Mel Giedroyc, Miranda Hart, Alan Davies, Jenny Eclair,  Rufus Hound, Steve Furst, Vikki Stone and Simon Lipkin.

Performances
Over the years, guest presenters and performers at the Launch Party have included Graham Norton, Elaine Paige, Michael Ball, Lesley Garrett, Ryan Molloy, James Earl Jones, Jools Holland, Patina Miller, Julian Clary, Jeremy Irons, Simon Russell Beale, Bertie Carvel and Meera Syal.

West End stars who have performed at the Awards Concerts at the Prince of Wales have included Alfie Boe, Sally Ann Triplett, Ryan Molloy, Jodie Prenger, Hannah Waddingham, Leanne Jones, Jill Halfpenny, Hadley Fraser, Ramin Karimloo, Rosemary Ashe, Nancy Sullivan, Samantha Barks, Sarah Lark, Kim Criswell, Siobhan McCarthy, Julie Atherton, Suranne Jones, Elena Roger, Sean Palmer, Clare Foster, Hannah Waddingham, Dean Chisnall, Brian May, Kerry Ellis, Tim Minchin, Melanie C and Sam Tutty.

Venues
The inaugural Launch Party was held at The Venue, before moving to the Dominion Theatre in 2004, Planet Hollywood in 2005 and 2006, and Café de Paris, where it has been every year since with the exception of the 2009 Awards, when it was held at the London Hippodrome as part of their campaign to save the venue as a performance space.

The first Awards Concert and ceremony was introduced for the 2008 Awards and was held at the 960-seat Lyric Theatre. The Concert moved to the 1,100-seat Prince of Wales Theatre for the 2009 Awards and was a sell-out for four straight years - 2009, 2010, 2011 and 2012. The concert moved to the Palace Theatre for the 2013 awards but returned to the Prince of Wales Theatre for 2014.

Award categories

Performance categories
 Best Performer in a Musical
 Best Supporting Performer in a Musical
 Best Performer in a Play
 Best Supporting Performer in a Play
 Best Professional Debut Performance
 Best Takeover In A Role

Production categories
 Best New Play
 Best New Comedy
 Best New Musical
 Best Play Revival
 Best Musical Revival
 Best Shakespearean Production
 Best Director
 Best Set Designer
 Best Lighting Designer
 Best Video Design 
 Best Choreographer
 Best Original Music

Special categories
 London Newcomer Of The Year
 Best Off-West End Production
 Best Regional Production
 Best West End Show
 Theatre Event Of The Year

Defunct categories
 Best Actor in a Play
 Best Actress in a Play
 Best Supporting Actor in a Play
 Best Supporting Actress in a Play
 Best Actor in a Musical
 Best Actress in a Musical
 Best Supporting Actor In a Musical
 Best Supporting Actress In a Musical
 Best Solo Performance
 Best Ensemble Performance

Recent winners

2008
Best Actress in a Play: Maggie Smith – The Lady from Dubuque at the Theatre Royal Haymarket
Best Actor in a Play: Ian McKellen – King Lear, RSC at the New London
Best Supporting Actress in a Play: Diana Rigg – All About My Mother at the Old Vic
Best Supporting Actor in a Play: Lee Evans – The Dumb Waiter at Trafalgar Studios
Best Actress in a Musical: Leanne Jones – Hairspray at the Shaftesbury
Best Actor in a Musical: Michael Ball – Hairspray at the Shaftesbury
Best Supporting Actress in a Musical: Tracie Bennett – Hairspray at the Shaftesbury
Best Supporting Actor in a Musical:Ben James-Ellis – Hairspray at the Shaftesbury
Best Solo Performance: Fiona Shaw – Happy Days at the NT Lyttelton
Best Ensemble Performance: The Taming of the Shrew & Twelfth Night – Propeller at the Old Vic
Best Takeover in a Role: Kerry Ellis – Wicked at the Apollo Victoria
Best New Play: All About My Mother by Samuel Adamson – at the Old Vic
Best New Comedy: Elling by Simon Bent – at the Bush & Trafalgar Studios
Best New Musical: Hairspray by Marc Shaiman, Scott Whitman, Mark O’Donnell & Thomas Meehan – at the Shaftesbury
Best Play Revival: Equus – at the Gielgud
Best Musical Revival: Joseph & the Amazing Technicolor Dreamcoat – at the Adelphi
The Best Shakespearean Production: Macbeth – at the Gielgud
Best Director: Jack O’Brien – Hairspray at the Shaftesbury
Best Set Designer: Rob Howell – The Lord of the Rings at the Theatre Royal Drury Lane
Best Choreographer: Jerry Mitchell – Hairspray at the Shaftesbury
London Newcomer of the Year: Daniel Radcliffe – Equus at the Gielgud
Best Off West End Production: A Christmas Carol & The Magic Flute – at the Young Vic and I Love You Because – at the Landor
Best Regional Production: Pygmalion – at the Theatre Royal Bath & on tour
Theatre Event of the Year: Daniel Radcliffe’s steamy publicity shots for Equus

2009 
Best Actress in a Play: Katy Stephens – The Histories, RSC at the Roundhouse
Best Actor in a Play: Kenneth Branagh – Ivanov, Donmar West End at Wyndham’s
Best Supporting Actress in a Play: Sophie Thompson – The Female of the Speciesat the Vaudeville
Best Supporting Actor in a Play: Tom Hiddleston – Othello at the Donmar Warehouse & Ivanov, Donmar West End at Wyndham’s
Best Actress in a Musical: Sofia Escobar – West Side Story at Sadler’s Wells
Best Actor in a Musical: Ryan Molloy – Jersey Boys at the Prince Edward
Best Supporting Actress in a Musical: Tracie Bennett – La Cage aux Folles at the Playhouse
Best Supporting Actor in a Musical: Stephen Ashfield – Jersey Boys at the Prince Edward
Best Solo Performance: Eddie Izzard – Stripped at the Lyric
Best Ensemble Performance: Into the Hoods – at the Novello
Best Takeover in a Role: Daniel Boys – Avenue Q at the Noël Coward
Books Best New Play: Under the Blue Sky by David Eldridge – at the Duke of York’s
Best New Comedy: Fat Pig by Neil LaBute – at Trafalgar Studios & the Comedy
Best New Musical: Jersey Boys by Bob Gaudio, Bob Crewe, Rick Elice & Marshall Brickman – at the Prince Edward
Best Play Revival: Ivanov, Donmar West End – at Wyndham’s
Best Musical Revival: West Side Story – at Sadler’s Wells
Best Shakespearean Production: Othello – at the Donmar Warehouse
Best Director: Michael Grandage – Othello & The Chalk Garden at the Donmar Warehouse & Ivanov, Donmar West End at Wyndham’s
Best Set Designer: Klara Zieglerova – Jersey Boys at the Prince Edward
Best Lighting Designer: Malcolm Rippeth – Brief Encounter at The Cinema, Haymarket & Six Characters in Search of an Author at the Gielgud
Best Choreographer: Lynne Page – La Cage aux Folles at the Menier Chocolate Factory & Playhouse
London Newcomer of the Year: Josh Hartnett – Rain Man at the Apollo	
Best Off West End Production: Come Dancing – at Theatre Royal Stratford East
Best Regional Production: Hamlet – RSC at the Courtyard Theatre, Stratford-upon-Avon
Theatre Event of the Year: David Tennant returning to the stage in Hamlet for the RSC

2010
Best Actress in a Play: Rachel Weisz - A Streetcar Named Desire at the Donmar Warehouse
Best Actor in a Play: Jude Law - Hamlet, Donmar West End at Wyndham's
Best Supporting Actress in a Play: Miriam Margolyes - Endgame at the Duchess
Best Supporting Actor in a Play: Patrick Stewart - Hamlet, RSC at the Novello
Best Actress in a Musical: Patina Miller - Sister Act at the London Palladium
Best Actor in a Musical: Rowan Atkinson - Oliver! at the Theatre Royal Drury Lane
Best Supporting Actress in a Musical: Jodie Prenger - Oliver! at the Theatre Royal Drury Lane
Best Supporting Actor in a Musical: Oliver Thornton - Priscilla, Queen of the Desert at the Palace
Best Solo Performance: Derren Brown - Derren Brown: Enigma at the Adelphi
Best Ensemble Performance: On the Waterfront at the Theatre Royal Haymarket
Best Takeover in a Role: John Barrowman - La Cage aux Folles at the Playhouse
Best New Play: Jerusalem by Jez Butterworth at the Royal Court Downstairs
Best New Comedy: Calendar Girls by Tim Firth at the Noël Coward
Best New Musical: Priscilla, Queen of the Desert by Allan Scott & Stephan Elliott at the Palace
Best Play Revival: A Streetcar Named Desire at the Donmar Warehouse
Best Musical Revival: Oliver! at the Theatre Royal Drury Lane
Best Shakespearean Production: Hamlet - RSC at the Novello
Best Director: Trevor Nunn - Inherit the Wind at the Old Vic & A Little Night Music at the Menier Chocolate Factory & Garrick
Best Set Designer: Brian Thomson - Priscilla, Queen of the Desert at the Palace
Best Lighting Designer: Natasha Katz - Sister Act at the London Palladium at The Cinema, Haymarket, & Six Characters in Search of an Author at the Gielgud
Best Choreographer: Ross Coleman - Priscilla, Queen of the Desert at the Palace
London Newcomer of the Year: Diana Vickers - The Rise & Fall of Little Voice at the Vaudeville
Best Off West End Production: The Pirates of Penzance at the Union Theatre
Best Regional Production: Adolf Hitler: My Part in His Downfall Bristol Old Vic & tour
Best West End Show: Wicked
Theatre Event of the Year: The pairing of Ian McKellen and Patrick Stewart in Waiting for Godot

2011
Best Actress in a Play: Zoe Wanamaker - All My Sons at the Apollo
Best Actor in a Play: David Suchet - All My Sons at the Apollo
Best Supporting Actress in a Play: Tamsin Greig - The Little Dog Laughed at the Garrick
Best Supporting Actor in a Play: Patrick Stewart - Hamlet, RSC at the Novello
Best Actress in a Musical: Sheridan Smith - Legally Blonde at the Savoy
Best Actor in a Musical: Ramin Karimloo - Love Never Dies at the Adelphi
Best Supporting Actress in a Musical: Jill Halfpenny - Legally Blonde at the Savoy
Best Supporting Actor in a Musical: Joseph Millson - Love Never Dies at the Adelphi
Best Solo Performance: Meera Syal - Shirley Valentine at the Menier Chocolate Factory & Trafalgar Studios 1
Best Ensemble Performance: Les Misérables 25th anniversary concert – the company of companies – at The O2
Best Takeover in a Role: Rachel Tucker - Wicked at the Apollo Victoria
Best New Play: Anne Boleyn by Howard Brenton – at Shakespeare's Globe
Best New Comedy: Yes, Prime Minister by Antony Jay & Jonathan Lynn – at the Gielgud
Best New Musical: Legally Blonde - by Nell Benjamin, Laurence O'Keefe & Heather Hach – at the Savoy
Best Play Revival: Cat on a Hot Tin Roof at the Novello
Best Musical Revival: Les Misérables 25th anniversary production at the Barbican
Best Shakespearean Production: Hamlet at the National, Olivier
Best Director: Timothy Sheader Into the Woods & The Crucible at the Open Air
Best Set Designer: Joanna Scotcher - The Railway Children at Waterloo Station
Best Lighting Designer: James Farncombe Ghost Stories at the Lyric Hammersmith & Duke of York’s
Best Choreographer: Jerry Mitchell - Legally Blonde at the Savoy
London Newcomer of the Year: Jonathan Groff - Deathtrap at the Noël Coward
Best Off West End Production: La Bohème at the Cock Tavern, Kilburn & Soho
Best Regional Production: Chess on tour
Best West End Show: Wicked
Theatre Event of the Year: Les Misérables 25th anniversary concert at The 02 & screened to cinemas worldwide

2012
Best Actress in a Play: Vanessa Redgrave - Driving Miss Daisy at Wyndham's
Best Actor in a Play: James Corden - One Man, Two Guvnors at the National, Lyttelton & Adelphi
Best Supporting Actress in a Play: Catherine Tate - Season's Greetings at the National, Lyttelton
Best Supporting Actor in a Play: Oliver Chris - One Man, Two Guvnors at the National, Lyttelton & Adelphi
Best Actress in a Musical: Amanda Holden - Shrek the Musical at the Theatre Royal Drury Lane
Best Actor in a Musical: Richard Fleeshman - Ghost the Musical at the Piccadilly
Best Supporting Actress in a Musical: Hannah Waddingham - The Wizard of Oz at the London Palladium
Best Supporting Actor in a Musical: Nigel Harman - Shrek the Musical at the Theatre Royal Drury Lane
Best Solo Performance: Kerry Ellis - Anthems at the Royal Albert Hall
Best Ensemble Performance: London Road - at the National, Cottesloe
Best Takeover in a Role: Alfie Boe - Les Misérables at the Queen's
Best New Play: Three Days in May by Ben Brown - at Trafalgar Studios 1
Best New Comedy: One Man, Two Guvnors by Richard Bean - at the National, Lyttelton & Adelphi
Best New Musical: Priscilla, Queen of the Desert by Allan Scott & Stephan Elliott at the Palace
Best Play Revival: Driving Miss Daisy at Wyndham's
Best Musical Revival: The Wizard of Oz at the London Palladium
Best Shakespearean Production: Much Ado About Nothing at Wyndham's
Best Director: Danny Boyle - Frankenstein at the National, Olivier
Best Set Designer: Rob Howell - Ghost the Musical at the Piccadilly & Matilda the Musical at the Cambridge
Best Lighting Designer: Hugh Vanstone - Ghost the Musical at the Piccadilly
Best Choreographer: Peter Darling - Matilda the Musical at the Cambridge
London Newcomer of the Year: Tim Minchin - Matilda the Musical at the Cambridge
Best Off West End Production: The Riots - at the Tricycle
Best Regional Production: Sweeney Todd at Chichester Festival
Best West End Show: War Horse
Theatre Event of the Year: David Tennant & Catherine Tate reuniting on stage in Much Ado About Nothing

2013
Best Actress in a Play: Sheridan Smith – Hedda Gabler at the Old Vic
Best Actor in a Play: Rupert Everett – The Judas Kiss at the Hampstead
Best Supporting Actress in a Play: Natalie Casey - Abigail's Party at the Menier Chocolate Factor & Wyndham's
Best Supporting Actor in a Play:  Stephen Fry – Twelfth Night at Shakespeare's Globe & the Apollo
Best Actress in a Musical: Imelda Staunton – Sweeney Todd at the Adelphi
Best Actor in a Musical: Michael Ball – Sweeney Todd at the Adelphi
Best Supporting Actress in a Musical: Melanie C – Jesus Christ Superstar at the O2
Best Supporting Actor in a Musical: Tim Minchin – Jesus Christ Superstar at the O2
Best Solo Performance:  Idina Menzel – Idina Menzel at the Apollo
Best Ensemble Performance: Richard III & Twelfth Night – at Shakespeare's Globe & the Apollo
Best Takeover in a Role: Ramin Karimloo – Les Misérables at the Queen's
Best New Play: The Curious Incident of the Dog in the Night-time by Simon Stephens – at the National, Cottesloe
Best New Comedy: The Ladykillers by Graham Linehan – at the Gielgud
Best New Musical: The Bodyguard by Alex Dinelaris – at the Adelphi
Best Play Revival: Abigail's Party – at the Menier Chocolate Factory & Wyndham's
Best Musical Revival: Sweeney Todd – at the Adelphi
Best Shakespearean Production: Twelfth Night – at Shakespeare's Globe & the Apollo
Best Director: Jonathan Kent – Sweeney Todd at the Adelphi
Best Set Designer: Tom Scutt – The Lion, the Witch & the Wardrobe at Kensington Gardens & Constellations at the Royal Court Upstairs & Duke of York's
Best Lighting Designer: Mark Henderson – Sweeney Todd at the Adelphi
Best Choreographer:  Andrew Wright – Singin' in the Rain at the Palace
Best Original Music: Sweet Smell of Success – Marvin Hamlisch at the Arcola
London Newcomer of the Year: Will Young – Cabaret at the Savoy
Best Off West End Production: Taboo – at the Brixton Club House
Best Regional Production:  American Idiot – on tour
Best West End Show: Les Misérables – at the Queen's
Theatre Event of the Year:  Danny Boyle's Olympics Opening Ceremony

2014
Best Actress in a Play: Dame Helen Mirren in The Audience
Best Actor in a Play: Daniel Radcliffe in The Cripple of Inishmaan
Best Supporting Actress in a Play: Haydn Gwynne in The Audience
Best Supporting Actor in a Play:  David Walliams in A Midsummer Night's Dream
Best Actress in a Musical: Scarlett Strallen in A Chorus Line and Candide
Best Actor in a Musical: Gavin Creel in The Book of Mormon
Best Supporting Actress in a Musical: Alexia Khadime in The Book of Mormon
Best Supporting Actor in a Musical: Stephen Ashfield in The Book of Mormon
Best Solo Performance:  Barry Humphries in Eat Pray Laugh!
Best Ensemble Performance: A Chorus Line at the London Palladium
Best Takeover in a Role: Carrie Hope Fletcher in Les Misérables
Best New Play: The Audience by Peter Morgan
Best New Comedy: The Play That Goes Wrong by Henry Shields, Henry Lewis and Jonathan Sayer
Best New Musical: The Book of Mormon at the Prince of Wales Theatre
Best Play Revival: To Kill A Mockingbird at the Open Air Theatre
Best Musical Revival: The Sound of Music at the Open Air Theatre
Best Shakespearean Production: A Midsummer Night's Dream at the Noël Coward Theatre
Best Director: Michael Grandage for the Michael Grandage Season
Best Set Designer: Mark Thompson for Charlie and the Chocolate Factory
Best Lighting Designer: Adam Silverman for Macbeth
Best Choreographer:  Peter Darling for Charlie and the Chocolate Factory
Best Original Music: Once by Glen Hansard and Marketa Irglova
London Newcomer of the Year: Rupert Grint in Mojo
Best Off West End Production: Titanic at Southwark Playhouse
Best Regional Production:   My Fair Lady at the Crucible
Best West End Show:  Matilda the Musical
Theatre Event of the Year:  National Theatre's 50th anniversary gala

2015

Best Actress in a Play: Billie Piper in Great Britain
Best Actor in a Play: David Tennant in Richard II
Best Supporting Actress in a Play: Vanessa Kirby in A Streetcar Named Desire
Best Supporting Actor in a Play:  Mark Gatiss in Coriolanus
Best Actress in a Musical: Eva Noblezada in Miss Saigon
Best Actor in a Musical: Jon Jon Briones in Miss Saigon
Best Supporting Actress in a Musical: Rachelle Ann Go in Miss Saigon
Best Supporting Actor in a Musical: Kwang Ho Hong in Miss Saigon
Best Takeover in a Role: Kerry Ellis for Wicked
Best New Play: Shakespeare in Love
Best New Musical: Memphis the Musical
Best Play Revival: Coriolanus
Best Musical Revival: Miss Saigon
Best Director: Laurence Connor for Miss Saigon
Best Set Designer: Totie Driver & Matt Kinley for Miss Saigon
Best Lighting Designer: Mark Henderson for Coriolanus
Best Choreographer:  Bob Avian & Geoffrey Garratt for Miss Saigon
Best Off West End Production: Sweeney Todd at Twickenham Theatre
Best Regional Production:   Oliver! at Sheffield Theatres
Best West End Show:  Miss Saigon

2016
Best Actress in a Play: Nicole Kidman for Photograph 51
Best Actor in a Play: Benedict Cumberbatch for Hamlet
Best Supporting Actress in a Play: Judi Dench, The Winter’s Tale
Best Supporting Actor in a Play:  Mark Gatiss, Three Days in the Country
Best Actress in a Musical: Imelda Staunton, Gypsy
Best Actor in a Musical: Matt Henry, Kinky Boots
Best Supporting Actress in a Musical: Lara Pulver, Gypsy
Best Supporting Actor in a Musical: David Bedella, In The Heights
Best New Play: Photograph 51 by Anna Ziegler
Best New Musical: Kinky Boots at the Adelphi Theatre
Best Play Revival: Hamlet at the Barbican
Best Musical Revival: Gypsy at the Savoy Theatre
Best Director: Jonathan Kent for Gypsy
Best Choreographer:  Jerry Mitchell for Kinky Boots
Best Set Designer: Es Devlin for Hamlet
Best Lighting Designer: Jane Cox for Hamlet
Best Off West End Production: Carrie the Musical at Southwark Playhouse
Best Regional Production:  Mary Poppins, UK tour
Best West End Show:  Les Miserables
Equity Award for Services to Theatre:  Kenneth Branagh

2017

Best Actress in a Play: Billie Piper for Yerma
Best Actor in a Play: Jamie Parker for Harry Potter and the Cursed Child
Best Supporting Actress in a Play: Noma Dumezweni for Harry Potter and the Cursed Child
Best Supporting Actor in a Play:  Anthony Boyle for Harry Potter and the Cursed Child
Best Actress in a Musical: Amber Riley for Dreamgirls
Best Actor in a Musical: Charlie Stemp for Half a Sixpence
Best Supporting Actress in a Musical: Emma Williams for Half a Sixpence
Best Supporting Actor in a Musical: Trevor Dion Nicholas for Disney's Aladdin
Best New Play: Harry Potter and the Cursed Child
Best New Musical: School of Rock
Best Play Revival: No Man's Land
Best Musical Revival: Funny Girl
Best Director: John Tiffany for Harry Potter and the Cursed Child
Best Set Designer: Christine Jones for Harry Potter and the Cursed Child
Best Lighting Designer: Neil Austin for Harry Potter and the Cursed Child
Best Video Design: Finn Ross and Ash Woodward for Harry Potter and the Cursed Child
Best Choreographer:  Andrew Wright for Half a Sixpence
Best Off West End Production: The Last Five Years, St James Theatre
Best Regional Production:  The Girls, National tour
Best West End Show:  Wicked and Les Misérables
Equity Award for Services to Theatre:  Cameron Mackintosh

2018

Best Actress in a Play: Olivia Colman for Mosquitoes
Best Actor in a Play: David Tennant for Don Juan in Soho
Best Supporting Actress in a Play: Juliet Stevenson for Hamlet
Best Supporting Actor in a Play:  Fra Fee for The Ferryman
Best Actress in a Musical: Carrie Hope Fletcher for The Addams Family
Best Actor in a Musical: John McCrea for Everybody's Talking About Jamie
Best Supporting Actress in a Musical: Lucie Shorthouse for Everybody's Talking About Jamie
Best Supporting Actor in a Musical: Ross Noble for Young Frankenstein
Best New Play: The Ferryman
Best New Musical: Everybody's Talking About Jamie
Best Play Revival: Hamlet
Best Musical Revival: 42nd Street
Best Director: Sam Mendes for The Ferryman
Best Set Designer: Douglas W, Schmidt for 42nd Street
Best Lighting Designer: Patrick Woodroffe for Bat Out of Hell
Best Video Design: 59 Productions for An American in Paris
Best Choreographer:  Randy Skinner for 42nd Street
Best Off West End Production: Hair, The Vaults
Best Regional Production:   Sunset Boulevard, National tour
Best Original Cast Recording:  Les Misérables
Best Show Poster:  Harry Potter and the Cursed Child
Best West End Show:  Harry Potter and the Cursed Child
Equity Award for Services to Theatre:  Sonia Friedman

2022

Best performer in a male identifying role in a musical: Eddie Redmayne - Cabaret, Playhouse Theatre, London

Best performer in a female identifying role in a musical: Carrie Hope Fletcher - Andrew Lloyd Webber's Cinderella, Gillian Lynne Theatre, London

Best supporting performer in a male identifying role in a musical: Hugh Coles - Back to the Future the Musical, Manchester Opera House and Adelphi Theatre, London

Best supporting performer in a female identifying role in a musical: Carly Mercedes Dyer - Anything Goes, Barbican Centre, London

Best performer in a male identifying role in a play: James McAvoy - Cyrano de Bergerac, Playhouse Theatre, London

Best performer in a female identifying role in a play: Lily Allen - 2:22 A Ghost Story, Noel Coward Theatre, London

Best supporting performer in a male identifying role in a play: Jake Wood - 2:22 A Ghost Story

Best supporting performer in a female identifying role in a play: Akiya Henry - The Tragedy of Macbeth, Almeida Theatre, London

Best new musical: Back to the Future the Musical

Best musical revival: Anything Goes

Best new play: 2:22 A Ghost Story

Best play revival: Cyrano de Bergerac

Best off-West End production: My Son's A Queer but What Can You Do? - The Turbine Theatre

Best regional theatre production: Rent - Hope Mill Theatre, Manchester

Best West End show: Six the Musical - Vaudeville Theatre

Best direction: Michael Grandage - Frozen, Theatre Royal Drury Lane, London

Best choreography: Rob Ashford - Frozen

Best set design: Christopher Oram - Frozen

Best costume design: Christopher Oram - Frozen

Best lighting design: Tim Lutkin - Back to the Future the Musical

Best musical direction or supervision: Stephen Oremus - Frozen

Best sound design: Gareth Owen - Back to the Future the Musical

Best video design: Finn Ross - Frozen

Best graphic design: Bob King Creative - Frozen

Past winners  
WhatsOnStage Awards Results - 2001
WhatsOnStage Awards Results - 2002
WhatsOnStage Awards Results - 2003
WhatsOnStage Awards Results - 2004
WhatsOnStage Awards Results - 2005
WhatsOnStage Awards Results - 2006
WhatsOnStage Awards Results - 2007

See also
WhatsOnStage.com

References

External links
 Official website

British theatre awards
Awards for projection designers